Gladfield is a rural locality in the Southern Downs Region, Queensland, Australia. In the  Gladfield had a population of 57 people.

History 
The locality name was derived from a pastoral run taken up in the 1840s, first by the Leslie brothers and later by Neil Ross who sold it in 1852, later becoming party of the Maryvale run.

Gladfield Provisional School opened on 1 August 1887. On 1 January 1909 it became Gladfield State School. It closed on 1967.

In the  Gladfield had a population of 57 people.

Notable residents
Former Brisbane Broncos coach Wayne Bennett owns 32 hectares of farmland out in Gladfield.

References 

Southern Downs Region
Localities in Queensland